Tunku Puan Zanariah binti Almarhum Tengku Ahmad, formerly known as Sultanah Zanariah (Jawi:تونكو ڤوان زنيرة بنت المرحوم تڠکو احمد) (5 July 1940 – 17 March 2019), was the second wife of Sultan Iskandar of Johor from their marriage in 1961 until his death in 2010. She served as Raja Permaisuri Agong between 1984 and 1989.

Her sister, Tunku Puan Nora née Sultanah Nora Ismail, married Sultan Ismail.

Early life
Born on 5 July 1940, in Dusun Green Palace, Pasir Mas, Kelantan. Tengku Zanariah was the seventh child of HH Tengku Panglima Raja Kelantan from among nine siblings. She came from the Kelantan royal family. Her father, the late Tengku Panglima Raja Tengku Ahmad was a son of HH Almarhum Tengku Temenggong Tengku Abdul Ghaffar Ibni HRH Long Senik Mulut Merah (Sultan Muhammad II).

Tengku Zanariah was enrolled into Sultanah Zainab School, Kelantan an elementary school where she studied from 1946 to 1949. Between 1950 and 1952 she studied at the Convent Bukit Nanas in Kuala Lumpur before returning to Kelantan where she continued her studies at Sultan Ibrahim School, Pasir Mas. With the encouragement of her father and her own desire to equip herself for the future, she left for England in 1954 to further her studies at the Upper Chime School, Isle of Wight.

While studying in England, Tengku Zanariah met Tunku Mahmood Iskandar (later Sultan Iskandar) who was also studying there. They later married in 1961, and became the mother of Tunku Mahmood's six children.

Sultanah of Johor

Her husband became Sultan of Johor in 1981. Although she was known as Sultanah, she was never formally crowned.

In 1982, Tengku Zanariah sponsored and established the Majlis Wanita Negeri Johor or MAWAR (the Women's Council of Johor), which organises various religious activities such as the celebration of the Prophet's birthday at its headquarters at Sungai Cat Road in Johor Bahru. MAWAR also collected donations for distribution among flood victims in Johor as well as the less fortunate and the needy.

Her husband died in 2010 and was succeeded by her stepson Tunku Ibrahim Ismail. In 2011, a government circular issued removed the honorific 'Sultanah' from her name, and instructed that she be referred to instead as 'Tunku Puan Zanariah' or simply 'Tunku Zanariah'. The current royal court also does not recognise her as a former holder of the title Sultanah of Johor.

Interests
Tengku Zanariah had a passion for the arts. She also loved cooking and took great care in her daily chores. She paid special attention to the selection and arrangement of decorations in the palace particularly in preparation for official dinners. Tengku Zanariah also loved reading especially about culture, history and affairs of neighbouring countries.

She was also the winner of the first edition of Miss Malaya-International 1960 where she had rights to represent Malaya in the first edition of  Miss International 1960 pageant in California, United States. Unfortunately, she did not placed in the pageant during that time.

During her free time, Tengku Zanariah loved to exercise, ride horses and play golf or tennis. She was also good in water skiing. During her younger days, she climbed Gunung Ledang, the highest mountain in Johor. She is currently the only consort to have done so.

Patronages
 Chancellor of the University of Technology, Malaysia (UTM) from 1986 to 2010.
 Patron of the Iskandar Puteri Foundation.
 Patron of the Women's Council of Johor (MAWAR) from 1982 to 2011.

Death
Tengku Zanariah died on 17 March 2019. She was laid to rest next to grave of her late mother, Che Puan Hajah Fatimah at the Mahmoodiah Royal Mausoleum in Johor Bahru, Johor.

Awards and recognitions

Honours of Johor 
  : 
 First Class of the Royal Family Order of Johor (D.K., 28 October 1972).
 Knight Grand Commander of the Order of the Loyalty of Sultan Ismail (S.S.I.J.).
 Sultan Ibrahim Medal 1st class (P.I.S.).

Honours of Malaysia
  : Recipient of the Order of the Crown of the Realm (D.M.N., 1987).
  : Royal Family Order of Kelantan (D.K.).
  : Royal Family Order of Kedah (D.K.)

Foreign Honours 
  : Family Order of Brunei (Darjah Kerabat Laila Utama, D.K., 4 April 1987)

Places named after her
Several places were named after her, including:
 Sultanah Zanariah Library, a library in Johor Bahru, Johor

References

Notes

Further reading

 Negara Brunei Darussalam: A Biographical Dictionary (1860-1996), A. V. M. Horton, 1996, 
 Challenging Times, Abdul Rahman, J. S. Solomon, published by Pelanduk Publications, 1985, 
 Information Malaysia, published by Berita Publications Sdn. Bhd., 1985
 Maklumat Lisan Johor: Projek Pelajar-Pelajar Lewartawanan, Kajian Sebaran Am, Institut Teknologi MARA, Biroteks, published by Institut Teknologi MARA, 1987
 Malaysian Protocol and Correct Forms of Address, Abdullah Ali, published by Times Books International, 1986, 
 Sistem beraja di Malaysia, Tan Chee Khoon, published by Pelanduk Publications, 1985

1940 births
2019 deaths
People from Kelantan
Johor royal consorts
Malaysian royal consorts
House of Temenggong of Johor
Malaysian beauty pageant winners
Malaysian people of Malay descent
Malaysian Muslims
Miss International 1960 delegates
First Classes of the Royal Family Order of Johor
Recipients of the Order of the Crown of the Realm